Shenzhen Ledman Football Club is a defunct Chinese professional football club from the People's Republic of China. The club was based in Shenzhen, Guangdong Province.

History
Shenzhen Renren Football Club was established in March 2015. They played in the 2015 China Amateur Football League finished the 3rd place and won promotion to 2016 China League Two. They changed their name to Shenzhen Ledman F.C. in December 2016.

Shenzhen Ledman officially disbanded after the 2018 league season.

Name history
 2015–2016: Shenzhen Renren F.C. 深圳人人
 2017: Shenzhen Ledman F.C. 深圳雷曼人人
 2017–2018: Shenzhen Ledman F.C. 深圳人人雷曼

Managerial history
  Zhang Jun (2015)
  Siniša Gogić (January 2016 – June 2016)
  Li Yuanping (caretaker) (June 2016 – September 2016)
  Zhang Jun (December 2016 – October 2018)
  Li Yuanping (caretaker) (October 2018 – present)

Results
All-time league rankings

As of the end of 2018 season.

Key
 Pld = Played
 W = Games won
 D = Games drawn
 L = Games lost
 F = Goals for
 A = Goals against
 Pts = Points
 Pos = Final position

 DNQ = Did Not Qualify
 DNE = Did Not Enter
 NH = Not Held
 – = Does Not Exist
 R1 = Round 1
 R2 = Round 2
 R3 = Round 3
 R4 = Round 4

 F = Final
 SF = Semi-finals
 QF = Quarter-finals
 R16 = Round of 16
 Group = Group stage
 GS2 = Second Group stage
 QR1 = First Qualifying Round
 QR2 = Second Qualifying Round
 QR3 = Third Qualifying Round

References

External links
Official website 

Football clubs in China
2018 disestablishments in China
Defunct football clubs in China
Association football clubs disestablished in 2018